List of Kentucky Civil War units may refer to:

 List of Kentucky Union Civil War units
 List of Kentucky Confederate Civil War units